McVay is a surname. Notable people with the surname include:

Bobby McVay, British broadcaster and musician, presenter of the breakfast show on Real Radio in South Wales
Charles B. McVay, Jr. (1868–1949), admiral in the United States Navy after World War I
Charles B. McVay III (1898–1968), the Commanding Officer of the USS Indianapolis (CA-35) when it was lost in action in 1945
Hugh McVay (1766–1851), the ninth Governor of the U.S. state of Alabama from July 17 to November 22, 1837
Jimmy McVay (1889–1950), footballer
John McVay (1931–2022), American football coach and executive
Kenneth McVay, OBC (born 1940), Canadian-American dual citizen and Internet activist against Holocaust denial
Kimo Wilder McVay (1927–2001), musician turned talent manager, who successfully promoted Hawaiian entertainment acts
Sean McVay (born 1986), American football coach
Swifty McVay (born 1974), American rapper and most notably, a member of Detroit rap group, D12

See also
McVeigh, surname
McVey, surname